Pavle Radinović, sometimes Radenović, (fl. 1371–d. 1415), was one of the most powerful Bosnian nobleman under Tvrtko I (r. 1377–1391), Dabiša (r. 1391–1395), Jelena Gruba (r. 1395–98), Ostoja (r. 1398–1404), Tvrtko II (r. 1404–1409) and Ostoja again (r. 1409–1418). He was head of Radinović-Pavlović noble family, a powerful magnate family whose initially possessions spread from central to eastern Bosnia, gravitating around the Prača - Miljacka river axis, between the Krivaja Drina and the Upper Bosna rivers, the seat in Borač and Pavlovac between Prača and Rogatica. He held mines in Olovo and Fojnica.

Early life
His father was Radin Jablanić (fl. 1380–d. 1397), who had possessions in Krivaja and around the Prača river. It is possible his sister or cousin was Kujava Radinović, the second consort of Stephen Ostoja. He was brought up at the Bosnian court.

Service and vassalage

Tvrtko I's reign
His scribe was Radosav Milosalić, mentioned in Pavle's charter (March 25, 1387).

Dabiša's reign

After Tvrtko's death, Pavle greatly expanded his realm, and held besides the hereditary territory around the rivers of Krivaja and Prača, the town of Borač near Vlasenica, the market of Prača, the mine of Olovo.

In 1392, Radič Sanković and his brother Beljak tried to sell Konavle to the Republic of Ragusa. The same year on May 15, Radič issued a charter to Ragusan merchants enabling them to trade in his territories. However, a council meeting was convoked by the king or nobility that objected the sale; Vlatko Vuković and Pavle Radenović were sent against Radič in December 1391 after receiving the council's blessings. The two captured Radič and occupied Konavle, dividing it between themselves, despite protests from Ragusa. The holding of Konavle meant that Pavle held several custom offices towards Ragusa, one of which was shared with Vlatko on Konavljanske Ledenice.  Vuković died shortly after this, and was succeeded by his nephew Sandalj Hranić, who continued to struggle against Radič.

When Stephen Dabiša (r. 1391–1395) died in September 1395, he had designated King Sigismund of Hungary, the husband of his cousin, Queen Mary, as his successor. Mary, however, had predeceased Dabiša, dying in May the same year. The Bosnian nobility refused to recognize Sigismund as king, as his right had rested in his status as Mary's husband. Instead, the nobility installed Jelena Gruba, his widow, and member of the Nikolić family, as the successor to her husband.

Jelena Gruba's reign
In 1397, his charter secured free trade and protection of Ragusans in his lands, for which he became honorary citizen of Ragusa. In foreign politics, he, as the other magnates of the Kingdom of Bosnia, supported Ladislaus of Naples in his struggle to wrestle the crown of Hungary from Sigismund of Luxemburg.

He and other magnates such as Hrvoje Vukčić (?-1416) and Sandalj Hranić nominally served Queen Jelena Gruba, and were de facto rulers of the kingdom.

Ostoja's first reign
Pavle participated in the decision to crown Ostoja as king in 1398. By the turn of the 14th century, he also held Trebinje, the Vrm župa (county) with the city of Klobuk and half of Konavle with Cavtat.

On April 22, 1404, Ostoja released a charter to the Republic of Venice regarding trade, and at this time Ostoja's court was composed of knez Pavle, vojvoda Vukmir Jurjević, vojvoda Pavle Klešić, vojvoda Radič Sanković and knez Radoje Radosalić. Of the "magnate triumvirate" that dominated Bosnia, only Pavle remained supporting Ostoja. Hranić captured and blinded Radič, and held him in prison until his death in 1404. The area of Nevesinje to the coast was taken by Hranić. Ostoja was deposed in 1404, and Tvrtko II was crowned the new King of Bosnia.

Tvrtko II's reign
After the demise of Ladislaus of Naples and his sale of the right to Dalmatia to the Republic of Venice in 1409, many nobles allied themselves with Sigismund and worked to depose Tvrtko II, who had supported Ladislaus, and they managed to return Sigismund's pretender Ostoja to the throne. Hranić also allied himself with Emperor Sigismund in mid-1411 and decided to establish closer connections with Sigismund's important ally Stefan Lazarević by marrying his widowed sister Jelena (who was the mother of Balša III, the ruler of Zeta), divorcing Hrvoje's niece Katarina (December 1411).

Pavle appointed knez Brailo Tezalović his protovestijar sometime in 1411. He was ready to sell his part of Konavle to the Ragusans in 1414, but this was never done.

Pavle's assassination during Ostoja's 2nd reign

A conspiracy against Pavle was hatched at the stanak held in Sutjeska in August 1415 and attended by all major noblemen except for Hrvoje. At the end of the month, during a walk at the Parena Poljana near royal court, a dispute erupted between Sandalj and Pavle. Sandalj and his men, joined by Vukmir Zlatonosović, drew out their swords and captured Pavle's son Petar. Pavle ran, but was caught and decapitated. A retainer of Pavle survived by seeking shelter in a Franciscan home; he later took Pavle's corpse to his estate in Vrhbosna. Petar was supposed to be blinded, but for some reason this did not take place. Pavle's lands were promptly divided between the conspirators. Sandalj justified the murder by accusing Pavle of bringing much misfortune to the Bosnian kingdom.

Family
Petar I Pavlović (d. March 1420),  duke (vojvoda), fell at battle with Sandalj's Ottoman troops
Radislav Pavlović (fl. 1420–d. 1441), Grand Duke of Bosnia (since 1441), knyaz (knez) and duke (vojvoda), succeeded by his son Ivaniš (r. 1441–1450)

Annotations

References

Sources

Bibliography

Further reading

Year of birth unknown
Year of birth uncertain
1415 deaths
p
p
Kingdom of Bosnia
Grand Knyazs of Bosnia
Bosnian magnates